The 2006 Historic Grand Prix of Monaco was the fifth running of the Historic Grand Prix of Monaco, a motor racing event for heritage Grand Prix, Voiturettes, Formula One, Formula Two and Sports cars.

Report 
Stefan Schollwoeck took a surprise pole and victory in Race A, driving a Maserati 6CM in a race usually dominated by ERAs. Jost Wildbolz, one of the pre-event favourites, topped the first practice session only for gearbox problems to draw his weekend to a close.

Stirling Moss entered Race B in the Ferguson P99, a car he had previously nominated as the greatest F1 car he ever drove, but was forced to retire when a driveshaft broke in practice. The race was dominated by Duncan Dayton, while Jos Koster and Tony Smith fought hard for the final step on the podium.

Joe Colasacco was very strong in practice for Race D, but was disqualified before the race due to uncertainties over his car's legality. The race was dominated by Denis Welch.

Michael Schryver secured pole position in Race E but retired early with gearbox and steering rack issues.

Race F pitted Monaco sparring partners Dayton and Joaquín Folch-Rusiñol against each other yet again. Under pressure, Folch-Rusiñol overshot the Nouvelle Chicance on the final lap but held the lead to the chequered flag. However, he was deemed to have gained an advantage by not slowing down enough and was dropped to second place after the race. Jacques Nicolet and Andrea Burani collided in qualifying and did not make the race start.

In Race G, Martin Stretton hit the wall during first qualifying and damaged the chassis of his Tyrrell P34, but made enough repairs by the second session to secure a place on the front row. In the race, he led at the first corner while Peter Williams collided with a spinning Peter Wuensch behind, triggering a safety car that kept the field bunched together. This created a tense battle for the lead during the final laps. Polesitter Paul Edwards attempted a bold move for the lead around the outside at Loews Hairpin on the final tour, but made contact and brushed the barriers, ending up classified the first car a lap down.

Results

Summary

Série A: Pre 1947 Grand Prix Cars

Série B: Front Engine Grand Prix Cars (1947–1960)

Série C: Pre 1953 Sports Cars

Série D: Formula Junior – Rear engine

Série E: Rear Engined Grand Prix Cars (1954–1965)

Série F: Formula 1 Cars (1966–1974)

Série G: Formula 1 Cars (1975–1978)

References 

Historic motorsport events
Monaco Grand Prix
Historic Grand Prix of Monaco
Historic Grand Prix of Monaco